Kacper Piechocki (born 17 December 1995) is a Polish professional volleyball player. At the professional club level, he plays for PGE Skra Bełchatów.

Career

Clubs
From 2012 to 2014, he was a player of AZS Częstochowa. In May 2014, he moved to PGE Skra Bełchatów. On 8 October 2014, his team won the Polish SuperCup. On 7 February 2016, alongside Skra, he won the Polish Cup after beating ZAKSA in the final. In April 2016, he was a member of the same team which won a bronze medal of the Polish Championship.

Honours

Clubs
 National championships
 2014/2015  Polish SuperCup, with PGE Skra Bełchatów
 2015/2016  Polish Cup, with PGE Skra Bełchatów
 2017/2018  Polish SuperCup, with PGE Skra Bełchatów
 2017/2018  Polish Championship, with PGE Skra Bełchatów
 2018/2019  Polish SuperCup, with PGE Skra Bełchatów

Youth national team
 2013  CEV U19 European Championship
 2013  European Youth Olympic Festival
 2014  CEV U20 European Championship

Individual awards
 2013: CEV U19 European Championship – Best Libero
 2014: CEV U20 European Championship – Best Libero

References

External links

 
 Player profile at PlusLiga.pl  
 Player profile at Volleybox.net

1995 births
Living people
Sportspeople from Bełchatów
Polish men's volleyball players
AZS Częstochowa players
Skra Bełchatów players
Liberos